Cryphalogenes is a genus of weevils belonging to the family Hydrophilidae endemic to the island of Sri Lanka.

Description
Frons convex, without sexually dimorphism. Eyes are elongate-oval, and entire. Antennal scape is elongate, and simple. Antennal funicle by 3-segments. Antennal club oval with weakly procurved sutures 1 and 2 which are marked by setae. There is a fine, raised line in pronotum with basal and lateral margins. Anterior margin of the pronotum armed by low, poorly formed serrations. Elytral punctures are replaced by rows of rounded strial and interstrial granules. Protibia armed by four socketed teeth.

Species
 Cryphalogenes euphorbiae Wood, 1980c
 Cryphalogenes exiguus Wood, 1980c

References

Curculionidae
Beetle genera